Ahmed Abdel Muti Hijazi (born in 1935 in Al-Menoufiya, Egypt) is an Egyptian contemporary poet.

Contributed to many literary conferences in many Arab capitals, and is one of the pioneers of the movement of renewal in contemporary Arabic poetry.

Education 
Bachelor of Arts, Department of Sociology at the University of Sorbonne, France, in 1979.

Positions held 
He was the managing editor of Rose al-Yūsuf magazine. In France he worked as a professor of Arabic poetry at the Paris 8 University and the new Sorbonne University. He returned to Cairo and worked for Al-Ahram newspaper. He served as editor-in-chief of Ibdaa magazine from 1990 to 2002 when he resigned from the post. He was reappointed editor-in-chief of the magazine in 2006.

Poetry works 
City Without A Heart, 1959.
Uras, 1959.
Nothing Remains but Confession,  1965
 Elegy of the Beautiful life, 1972
 Creatures of the Kingdom of the Night, 1978.
 Cement Trees, 1989.
 Ruins of Time, 2011.
Me and the city, 1957.

Writings 
Muhammad and those
Ibrahim Nagi
Khalil Mutran
An interview Tuesday
My poetry
Other cities
Arabism of Egypt
Ahmed Shawqi grandchildren

Awards 
Was awarded the 1989 Egyptian-Greek Cavafy
Egyptian State incentive prize in literature of the Supreme Council of Culture, 1997
African Poetry Prize, 1996

See also

List of Egyptians

References

   Dubai International Poetry Festival

1935 births
Living people
University of Paris alumni
20th-century Egyptian poets
Egyptian expatriates in France
21st-century Egyptian poets
Egyptian male poets
20th-century male writers
21st-century male writers